The Oxfordshire Stakes was a greyhound competition held at Oxford Stadium until it closed.

It was inaugurated in 1964 and was a major event in the 1960s and 1970s.  It changed its name to the Oxfordshire Trophy in 1982 but reverted to its original name in 2008.

Past winners

Discontinued

Notes
 2006 event delayed - held during Feb 2007
 2010 Not held

Distances
1964-1973 (500 yards)
1974-1974 (490 yards)
1975-2012 (450 metres)

Sponsors
2000-2001 (Jarrad Isherwood Bookmakers)
2002-2002 (McLeans Coaches)
2003-2007 (Blanchford Building Supplies)
2008-2009 (Property Care Complete Maintenance) 
2011-2011 (Stadium Bookmakers)
2012-2012 (Blanchford Building Supplies)

References

Greyhound racing competitions in the United Kingdom
Sport in Oxfordshire
Recurring sporting events established in 1964